Kalateh-ye Hoseyn Mohammad Qasem (also Romanized as Kalāteh-ye Ḩoseyn Moḩammad Qāsem; also known as Kalāteh-ye Rostam) is a village in Meyghan Rural District, in the Central District of Nehbandan County, South Khorasan Province, Iran. At the 2006 census, its population was 14, in 4 families.

References 

Populated places in Nehbandan County